Kommissar LaBréa is a German television series.

See also
List of German television series

External links
 

German crime television series
2009 German television series debuts
2010 German television series endings
Television shows set in Paris
German-language television shows
Das Erste original programming
2000s German police procedural television series